Muhammad Ali Rashid is a Pakistani politician who served as a member of the National Assembly of Pakistan, from September 2013 to May 2018.

Political career

He was elected to the National Assembly of Pakistan as a candidate of Muttahida Qaumi Movement (MQM) from Constituency NA-254 (Karachi-XVI) in by-elections held in August 2013. He received 53,045 votes and defeated Muhammad Naem, a candidate of Pakistan Tehreek-e-Insaf (PTI).

References

Living people
Muttahida Qaumi Movement politicians
Pakistani MNAs 2013–2018
Politicians from Karachi
Muttahida Qaumi Movement MNAs
Year of birth missing (living people)